This is a list of ecoregions in Belize as defined by the World Wildlife Fund and the Freshwater Ecoregions of the World database.

Terrestrial ecoregions

Tropical and subtropical moist broadleaf forests
 Petén–Veracruz moist forests
 Yucatán moist forests

Tropical and subtropical coniferous forests
 Belizian pine forests

Mangroves
 Belizean Coast mangroves
 Belizean Reef mangroves
 Mayan Corridor mangroves

Freshwater ecoregions

Tropical and subtropical coastal rivers
 Quintana Roo - Motagua

Marine ecoregions

Tropical Northwestern Atlantic
 Western Caribbean (includes the Mesoamerican Barrier Reef)

See also
List of ecoregions in Guatemala
List of ecoregions in Mexico

References

 
Ecoregions
Belize